Heinrich Gustav Ferdinand Holm, often referred to as H.G.F. Holm, (23 April 1803, Berlin – 1 May 1861, Copenhagen) was a Danish artist and engraver who is remembered for his finely detailed topographical paintings and drawings of Copenhagen and surroundings.

Biography

Holm initially followed in the footsteps of his father as an engraver and illustrator. He had almost certainly been a pupil of C. J. Thomsen who insisted on accuracy and detail, qualities which are reflected in his own work. As a result, Holm quickly became a master of his genre, not only as an illustrator but in the difficult technique of watercolour painting. He began to specialize in illustrating prospectuses, often sketching areas and buildings of interest before making multiple copies at home, often with minor variations. He sometimes produced skeleton drawings which he later coloured with watercolour. His subjects were taken mainly from the streets and squares of Copenhagen, comprising castles and churches, the stock exchange, the university, as well as views of the city from vantage points such as Rundetårn. In addition, he produced a series of works covering the surrounding countryside, for example the collection Sjællands yndigste Egne (1826–28). Many of his plates appeared in magazines such as Magazin for Ungdommen (1839–40), its successor Cosmorama (1840–43), and Nyt Magazin for Natur og Menneskekundskab (1848). He also illustrated prospectuses for the Royal Procelain Factory, especially in regard to designs for tea and coffee cups. Despite Holm's high rate of productivity, he constantly suffered from lack of money, which frequently drove him to drink. The resulting vicious circle encouraged him to sell his works at low prices which explains how he was given the nickname: Fattigholm or "Poor Holm".

Works

Holm's many small works continue to be of considerable value. They are of great topographical and cultural interest as they provide one of the best representations of Golden Age Copenhagen, both in terms of the city as a whole and its individual buildings, including life in the streets. In addition, thanks to their high technical quality and his sense of colour, his watercolours are of high artistic quality.

Gallery

References

External links

1803 births
1861 deaths
19th-century Danish painters
19th-century Danish engravers
19th-century Danish printmakers
Danish male painters
Artists from Copenhagen
Danish cityscape artists
19th-century Danish male artists